William Henry Richardson (December 5, 1808 – December 14, 1878) was an American physician and politician.

Richardson, only son of Levi and Amelia (Trumbull) Richardson, was born in Chaplin, then a part of Mansfield, Conn., December 5, 1808.  At an early age he moved with his parents to North Mansfield, Conn., where he resided much the greater part of his life. He pursued his medical studies, first with Dr. Archibald Welch of Mansfield, subsequently with Dr. Samuel B. Woodward of Wethersfield and Dr. Silas Fuller of Columbia, and at the medical school of Yale College, where he graduated in 1834.  On graduating, he returned to Mansfield and immediately, entered on the practice of his profession, which he followed, with assiduity and success, for more than forty years. After three years of impaired health, he died from disease of the brain, December 14, 1878, aged 70 years.

In 1862, he was a member of the Connecticut State Legislature. For many years he served as School Visitor.

He was married in 1853 to Abigail, daughter of Edmund Freeman, Esq., of Mansfield, who with their only son survived him.

References 

1808 births
1878 deaths
People from Windham County, Connecticut
Yale School of Medicine alumni
Physicians from Connecticut
Members of the Connecticut General Assembly
19th-century American politicians